Sergio Oregel (born May 16, 2005) is an American professional soccer player who plays as a midfielder for Major League Soccer club Chicago Fire.

Club career

Youth
Oregel joined the academy in 2018. In his final season with the Academy in 2021, Oregel helped the team win the inaugural MLS NEXT under-19 Championship on July 3. Oregel earned the MLS NEXT U-19 Golden Ball, which is awarded to the best player of the tournament in each age division.

Chicago Fire
On October 23, 2021, it was announced that Oregel had signed a homegrown player deal with the Chicago Fire senior team, on a deal that would begin in 2022. In 2022, Oregel spent the majority of the season with the club's MLS Next Pro side, where he made 17 appearances.

References

External links
 Profile at Chicago Fire

2005 births
Living people
American soccer players
Association football midfielders
Chicago Fire FC players
Chicago Fire FC II players
Homegrown Players (MLS)
Major League Soccer players
MLS Next Pro players
Soccer players from Illinois
Sportspeople from Chicago
United States men's youth international soccer players